Colonia Insurgentes Mixcoac, or simply Insurgentes Mixcoac, is a neighborhood located in Benito Juárez, Mexico City.

Location
Colonia Insurgentes Mixcoac is located in the Benito Juárez borough in southern Mexico City.

The neighborhood is bordered by:

Empresa street on the north, across which is Colonia Extremadura Insurgentes and Colonia San Juan
Av. Revolución on the west, across which is Mixcoac
Av. Río Mixcoac on the south, across which is San José Insurgentes
Avenida de los Insurgentes Sur on the east, across which is Colonia del Valle Sur and Colonia Actipan

Trivia
The Augusto Rodin street was used as a location in the 1982 Costa-Gavras film Missing, that was shot through different locations of Mexico City, used to depict the post-1973 coup d'état Chile.

Culture
The neighborhood houses the Centro Cultural Juan Rulfo, a cultural centre that hosts several cultural activities such as expositions, music and dance. The house was built in 1912 by orders of Porfirio Díaz, Mexican president at the time, to serve as town hall of the Mixcoac municipality. In 1975, it was transformed into the cultural centre.

Education
Insurgentes Mixcoac is home to two private universities: Simón Bolívar University and Universidad Panamericana, the latter, alma mater to former president of Mexico Enrique Peña Nieto.

The neighborhood also has a secondary school: Escuela Secundaria Diurna No. 10 Leopoldo Ayala (Secondary School No. 10 Leopoldo Ayala).

Transportation

Public transportation
The area is served by the Mexico City Metro, Metrobús and EcoBici bikeshare. While it is not located in the neighborhood, Insurgentes Sur metro station is within walking distance.

Metro stations
Mixcoac  

Metrobús stations
  Félix Cuevas
  Río Churubusco

References

Benito Juárez, Mexico City